NSJV can mean:
 Nationaalsocialistische Jeugd in Vlaanderen ("National Socialist Youth of Flanders"), a fascist youth organization that existed in Flanders during World War II
 Nordsjællands Veterantog, a heritage railway operator in North Zealand, Denmark